Aadu Lüüs (also Ado Lüüs; 17 November 1878 Vana-Antsla Rural Municipality, Võru County – 12 February 1967 Stockholm) was an Estonian pediatrician, medical scientist. He was the first Estonian pediatrician-scientist.

In 1907 he graduated from Tartu University in medicine.

He published over 90 scientific publications. His main fields of research were childhood diseases, children and mothers protection in Estonia and abroad, and eugenics.

Awards:
 1938: Order of the White Star, III class.

Works

References

1878 births
1967 deaths
Estonian physicians